Lobocharacium is a genus of green algae in the family Characiosiphonaceae.

References

Chlamydomonadales genera
Chlamydomonadales